Erna Augusta Brinkman (born 25 March 1972 in Sneek, Friesland) is a retired volleyball player from the Netherlands, who represented her native country at two consecutive Summer Olympics, starting in 1992. 

Brinkman was a member of the Netherlands national team that won the gold medal at the 1995 European Championship by defeating Croatia 3–0 in the final.

References
  Dutch Olympic Committee

1972 births
Dutch women's volleyball players
Volleyball players at the 1992 Summer Olympics
Volleyball players at the 1996 Summer Olympics
Olympic volleyball players of the Netherlands
Sportspeople from Friesland
People from Sneek
Living people